The High Sheriff of Oxfordshire, in common with other counties, was originally the King's representative on taxation upholding the law in Saxon times. The word Sheriff evolved from 'shire-reeve'.

The title of High Sheriff is therefore much older than the other crown appointment, the Lord Lieutenant of Oxfordshire, which came about after 1545. Between 1248 and 1566 Berkshire and Oxfordshire formed a joint shrievalty (apart from a brief period in 1258/9). See High Sheriff of Berkshire.

List of High Sheriffs of Oxfordshire

1066–1068: Saewold
1066–1086: Edwin
1071: Robert D'Oyly

12th century
c. 1130: Restold
c. 1142–?: William de Chesney
1135–1154: Henry de Oxford
1155–1159: Henry D'Oyly, 4th Baron Hocknorton
1160: Manasser Arsick and Henry D'Oyly, 4th Baron Hocknorton
1161–1162: Manasser Arsick
1163: Thomas Basset
1164–1169: Adam de Catmore
1170–1174: Alard Banastre
1175–1178: Robert de Tureville
1179–1181: (first half): Geoffrey Hose
1181: (second half)–1184 (first half): Robert de Whitfield
1184: (second half)–1186 (first half): Alanus de Furnell
1186: (second half)–1190: Robert de la Mare
1187–1194: (first half): William Briwere
1194: (second half)–1196: Henry D'Oyly, 5th Baron Hocknorton
1197–1199: Hugh de Neville

13th century
1200–1201 (first half): Gilbert Basset
1201 (second half)–1202 (first half): William Briwere
1202 (second half)–1214 (first quarter): Thomas Basset
1214 (last three-quarters): Ralph de Normanville
1215–1223: Falkes de Breauté
1223 (last three-quarters)–1224 (first half): Richard de Ripariis (Rivers)
1224–1268: Sir Gilbert de Kirkby, also Sheriff for Northamptonshire at same time
1224 (second half), 1225 (first quarter): Walter Foliot
1225 (last three-quarters)–1231: Godfrey of Crowcombe
1232: John de Hulecote (first three-quarters)
1232 (last quarter)–1233: Engelard de Cigogné
1233 (last quarter)–1235 (first half): John Le Brunn (or John Brunus)
1235 (second half)–1238 (first half): John de Tiwe
1238 (third quarter): Richard Suhard
1238 (last quarter): Paul Peyure
1239: John de Plessitis
1240–1244 (first quarter): William Hay
1244 (last three-quarters)–1247 (first half): Alanus de Farnham
1247 (second half)–1248: Guy fitz Robert

1248–1566
See High Sheriff of Berkshire

16th century

17th century

18th century

19th century

20th century

21st century

References

 The history of the worthies of England, Volume 3 By Thomas Fuller
 Early High Sheriffs of Oxfordshire

 
Oxfordshire
Local government in Oxfordshire
Oxfordshire-related lists